Kings Cross ER: St Vincent's Hospital was an Australian factual television show that looks at the work of the Emergency Department at St Vincent's Hospital in Darlinghurst, Sydney. This observational documentary series began on the Crime & Investigation Network on 2 February 2012. A second season began on 14 February 2013. A third season began in 2015 on the free-to-air Nine Network and aired 7:30 pm Thursdays.

The show was created and produced by John McAvoy. It is narrated by Australian actress Sacha Horler.

Series overview

Overview
St Vincent's Hospital's emergency department, located in Darlinghurst is one of the busiest in New South Wales with 42,000 patients presenting each year. It is a level one trauma centre with a catchment area that includes many of Sydney's  nightlife precincts including Kings Cross, Sydney's CBD, Rose Bay, Surry Hills, Paddington, Woollahra, Bondi Junction and Double Bay. The hospital's location in Australia's most populous city makes for a diverse catchment area. The program observes the fast-paced work of the emergency department's dedicated doctors and nurses and their interactions with patients and each other.

Episodes

Season 1

Season 2

Season 3

Doctors and nurses

Season 1 
Professor Gordian Fulde, director of ER
Kirsty Short, registrar
Jo Short, registrar
Dr Andrew Finckh, staff specialist
Dr Kate Sellors, senior registrar
Dr Tim Stewart, registrar
Brendan Clifford, nurse
Adele Mooney, nurse
Carolyn Milton, nurse
Justine Branch, nurse
David Darley, senior resident

Season 2 
Professor Gordian Fulde, director of ER
Kirsty Short, registrar
Jo Short, registrar
Dr Iromi Samarasinghe, physician
Dr Anthony Van Assche, registrar
Dr Jamie Andrews, registrar
Dr Lee Blair, registrar
Dr Mo Haywood, senior resident
Dr Nikki Bart, senior resident

Source

Reception
Kings Cross ER: St Vincent's Hospital has been praised by critics. Graeme Blundell of The Australian applauded the program, writing "It is thoughtful, thorough, emotional and professional and, rare for reality TV, leaves us with more questions than answers and more hope than despair."

In its first two seasons on the CI Network, Kings Cross ER became the highest rating documentary series in Australian subscription television history. It was subsequently acquired by the Nine Network and its ratings increased on the free-to-air channel.

Logie Awards

See also

RPA
Young Doctors
Medical Emergency

References

External links
Official web site http://www.9jumpin.com.au/show/kings-cross-er/
Former official website for seasons 1-2 https://web.archive.org/web/20120206182744/http://www.citv.com.au/tv-shows/show-details.aspx?show=620
St Vincent's Hospital, Sydney https://svhs.org.au/home

2012 Australian television series debuts
2015 Australian television series endings
2010s Australian medical television series
Australian factual television series
Australian workplace television series
English-language television shows
Nine Network original programming
Television shows set in Sydney